Samuel Greene Arnold Jr. (April 12, 1821February 14, 1880) was an attorney and politician from Rhode Island. A Republican, he was most notable for his service as lieutenant governor and as a United States senator.

Early life
Born in Providence, Arnold received his early education under private tutors, then graduated from Brown University in 1841 and Harvard Law School in 1845. He was admitted to the bar in 1845, and practiced in Providence. He was also a historian, and he served as a trustee of Brown University from 1848 to 1880.

Career
Arnold was elected Lieutenant Governor of Rhode Island in 1852 and served as acting governor. In 1859, he was elected an Associate Fellow of the American Academy of Arts and Sciences, where he wrote the two-volume History of the State of Rhode Island and Providence Plantations in 1859. He was a member of the peace commission held at Washington, D.C. in 1861 in an effort to prevent the impending civil war.

In March 1861, Arnold was again elected lieutenant governor after being nominated by the Constitutional Union and Democratic Conventions. He was again elected lieutenant governor in 1862.

Shortly after the outbreak of the Civil War, Arnold was appointed as a military aide to Governor William Sprague with rank of colonel, and he raised the 1st Rhode Island Battery of light artillery, which went to Washington D.C. and was mustered into the Union Army for three months.

He was elected as a Republican to the U.S. Senate to fill the vacancy caused by the resignation of James F. Simmons, and he served from December 1, 1862 to March 3, 1863. After his time in the Senate, he returned to historical research and was president of the Rhode Island Historical Society from 1868 to 1880. He died in Providence on February 13, 1880; interment was in Swan Point Cemetery.

Family 
He married his cousin Louisa Gindrat Arnold (1828–1905), the daughter of his father's uncle Richard J. Arnold (1796–1873). He wrote, "I have brought up my cousin for years to make her my wife, for I am so fastidious & particular on that matter that I knew I never should find a lady to suit me in all respects unless I educated her for the purpose. This is an original idea to be sure."

Arnold's grandnephew Theodore Francis Green was also a U.S. Senator from Rhode Island.

References

External links
 Retrieved on 2008-02-14

Samuel G. and Louisa G. Arnold papers

1821 births
1880 deaths
Politicians from Providence, Rhode Island
Baptists from Rhode Island
Rhode Island Republicans
Brown University alumni
Harvard Law School alumni
19th-century American historians
19th-century American male writers
Union Army officers
People of Rhode Island in the American Civil War
Lieutenant Governors of Rhode Island
Republican Party United States senators from Rhode Island
Fellows of the American Academy of Arts and Sciences
Burials at Swan Point Cemetery
19th-century American politicians
19th-century Baptists
American male non-fiction writers
Historians from Rhode Island